Girolamo Cardinal Bernerio, O.P. (1540 – 5 August 1611) was an Italian Cardinal of the Roman Catholic Church.

Biography
Bernerio was born in Corregio.  He served as Bishop of Ascoli Piceno from 1586 until his resignation in 1605. He was elevated to Cardinal on 16 November 1586 and installed as the Cardinal-Priest of S. Tommaso in Parione the following year. He subsequently became the Cardinal-Priest of S. Maria sopra Minerva (1589), the Cardinal-Priest of S. Lorenzo in Lucina (1602), the Cardinal-Bishop of Albano (1603) and the Cardinal-Bishop of Porto e Santa Rufina (1607).

On 7 September 1586, Bernario was consecrated to the episcopacy by Giulio Antonio Santorio with Giulio Masetti, Bishop of Reggio Emilia, and Ottavio Paravicini, Bishop of Alessandria, serving as co-consecrators. Through his own consecration of Galeazzo Sanvitale, Cardinal Bernerio is in the episcopal lineage of Pope Francis, Pope Benedict XVI, and most modern bishops.

Episcopal Succession

See also

Catholic Church hierarchy
College of Cardinals
List of living cardinals
Politics of Vatican City
Roman Curia

References

Italian Dominicans
16th-century Italian Roman Catholic bishops
Cardinal-bishops of Albano
Cardinal-bishops of Porto
Dominican cardinals
1540 births
1611 deaths
17th-century Italian Roman Catholic bishops
16th-century Italian cardinals
17th-century Italian cardinals